National Defense Medical Center (NDMC) is a ROC military affiliated medical school in Taipei, Taiwan. The NDMC is responsible for the training of military doctors, nurses and other medical personnel.

History 
The former institute of the National Defense Medical Center, established by Yuan Shikai in Tianjin, China in 1902, was recognized as the first military school in Chinese history. This center was the amalgamation of the Army Medical College, the Wartime Health Personnel Training Center and its 13 branches in Shanghai, China on June 1, 1947, and later, in 1949, moved to Taipei, Taiwan. Following the annexation of the Tri-Service General Hospital, a total integration of basic and clinic department was achieved in 1983. In October, 1999, the school moved to the Neihu District of Taipei; in the next year, the Tri-Service General Hospital, the affiliated hospital, also moved to Neihu, where they were renamed collectively as the National Defense Medical Center.

Educational Systems

Graduate Institutes

Doctorate Program 
Institute of Medical Sciences
Institute of Life Science (formed by NDMC, Academia Sinica, and NHRI)

Master Program 
Inst. of Dental Sciences
Inst. of Pharmaceutical Sciences
Inst. of Nursing
Inst. of Public Health
Inst. of Biology & anatomy
Inst. of Physiology
Inst. of Microbiology & Immunology
Inst. of Pathology & Parasitology 
Inst. of Biochemistry
Inst. of Pharmacology
Inst. of Aerospace and Undersea Medicine

Undergraduate Program 
School of Medicine
School of Pharmacy
School of Dentistry
School of Nursing
School of Public Health

Presidents 
 LTG Robert Kho-Seng Lim (林可勝) (1947–1953)
 LTG Chih-Teh Loo (盧致德) (1953–1975)
 LTG Chok-Yung Chai (蔡作雍) (M47) (1975–1984)
 LTG (潘樹人) (M39) (1984–1989)
 LTG T. H. Yin (尹在信) (M49) (1989–1991)
 LTG Cheng-Ping Ma (馬正平) (M49) (1991–1993)
 LTG Hsheng-Kai Lee (李賢鎧) (M59) (1993–1996)
 LTG Kao-Liang Shen (沈國樑) (M59) (1996–2000)
 MG Sun-Yuan Chang (張聖原) (M66) (2000–2002)
 MG Hsian-Jenn Wang (王先震) (M66) (2003–2005) 
 MG Deh-Ming Chang (張德明) (M74) (2005-) member of American College of Rheumatology.

Notable alumni 
 Chang-Sheng Yin (尹長生) (M66), World famous gynecologist, President of Kung-Ning General Hospital.
 Jeng Wei (魏崢) (M68), famous cardiac surgeon, former superintendent of Cheng Hsin Medical Center.
 Shinn-zong Lin (林欣榮) (M73), superintendent of Buddhist Tzu Chi Medical Center.

Teaching Hospital & Practice Institutions

Teaching Hospital 
 Tri-Service General Hospital

Practice Institutions 
Taipei Veterans General Hospital
Taichung Veterans General Hospital
Kaohsiung Veterans General Hospital
Chi Mei Medical Center
Synpac-Kingdom Pharmaceutical Co.
Yung Shin Pharm. Ind. Co.
Veterans Pharmaceutical Plant
Health Centers in the northern Taiwan

Contact 
 No.161, Sec. 6, Minquan E. Rd., Neihu District, Taipei City 114, Taiwan (R.O.C.)
 Phone：+886-2-87923100

See also 

 List of universities in Taiwan

External links 

 About Ndmc
 National Defense Medical Center
 Tri-Service General Hospital

1902 establishments in China
Educational institutions established in 1902
Military academies of Taiwan
Universities and colleges in Taipei